Geddes may refer to:

Places
Scotland
 Geddes, Highland, a small village south of Nairn in the Scottish Highlands
 Geddes House, Nairn

United States
 Geddes, New York, a town
 Geddes, South Dakota, a city
 Geddes, Michigan, an unincorporated community
Geddes Dam, dam in Michigan
 Geddes (Clifford, Virginia), a historic site included on the National Register of Historic Places listings in Amherst County, Virginia

Elsewhere
 Cape Geddes, Antarctica
 Geddes Crag, Antarctica
Ladang Geddes, Malaysian rubber plantation, formerly owned by the Dunlop Rubber Company
 Geddes (crater), on the planet Mercury

People 
 Geddes (surname), people with the surname and an etymology

Other
 Baron Geddes, a title in the Peerage of the United Kingdom
Geddes Axe, retrenchment of British government expenditure following WW1, named after Sir Eric Geddes